I'm a Real Mexican (Spanish: Soy puro mexicano) is a 1942 Mexican comedy thriller film directed by Emilio Fernández and starring Pedro Armendariz, Janet Alcoriza and David Silva. Its plot has drawn comparisons to the American All Through the Night released the same year.

The film's sets were designed by the art director Jesús Bracho.

Synopsis
A Mexican bandit escapes from jail and becomes entangled with a ring of Axis agents who are plotting an invasion of Mexico.

Cast
 Pedro Armendáriz as Guadalupe Padilla 
 Janet Alcoriza as Raquel
 David Silva as Juan Fernández 
 Andrés Soler as Osoruki Kamasuri 
 Margarita Cortés as Conchita 
 Charles Rooner as Rudolph Hermann von Ricker 
 Antonio Bravo as Agente X 32 
 Alfredo Varela as Pepe 
 Pedro Galindo 
 Alejandro Cobo
 Miguel Inclán as Pedro 
 Armando Soto La Marina as Ángel 
 Conchita Sáenz as Mamá de Conchita 
 Alfonso Bedoya
 Abelardo Guttiérez 
 Egon Zappert  
 Ernest Ruschin 
 Modesto Luengo 
 Stephen Berne as Esbirro de Rudolph 
 Max Langler 
 Pedro Vargas
 Luis Aguilar as Rafael
 Rogelio Fernández

References

Bibliography 
 Herzberg, Bob. Revolutionary Mexico on Film: A Critical History, 1914-2014. McFarland, 2014.

External links 
 

1942 films
1940s comedy thriller films
Mexican comedy thriller films
1940s Spanish-language films
Films directed by Emilio Fernández
Mexican black-and-white films
1942 comedy films
1940s Mexican films